Garbutt may refer to:

Places
Garbutt, New York, a hamlet between Scottsville and Mumford
Garbutt, Queensland, a suburb in the city of Townsville, in Australia
Garbutt House, Frank A. Garbutt's mansion in the Silver Lake section of Los Angeles

Surname
Garbutt (name)

People with the surname
George Garbutt (born 1903), Canadian ice hockey player
James Garbutt, British actor
John Garbutt (ca. 1779-1855), New York politician
Josh Garbutt (born 1984), Canadian professional ice hockey player
Vin Garbutt (1947–2017), English folk singer and songwriter
William Garbutt (1883–1964), English football player and coach
Luke Garbutt (born 1993), English footballer
Ryan Garbutt (born 1985), Canadian ice hockey player

See also
Garbett, a surname